"Love Me More" is a song by American rapper Trippie Redd, released on November 1, 2019, as the lead single from his fourth mixtape A Love Letter to You 4 (2019). It was written by Trippie Redd and its producers, Nick Mira and Taz Taylor.

Music video 
The music video was released along with the single on November 1, 2019. It was directed by James Mackel. It starts off with Trippie Redd "wrapped in a tight embrace" with a partner, then shows the couple in a car driving throughout a city, with Redd resting his head lovingly on her shoulder. The video also shows his partner sliding down a pole and entertaining, which Trippie wishes the vision is reality.

Charts

Certifications

References 

2019 singles
2019 songs
Trippie Redd songs
Songs written by Trippie Redd
Songs written by Nick Mira
Songs written by Taz Taylor (record producer)

Song recordings produced by Taz Taylor (record producer)